CSS Isondiga was a small wooden gunboat without masts that served in the Confederate States Navy during the American Civil War.

Isondiga operated in waters around Savannah, Georgia, and in Saint Augustine Creek, Florida, from April 1863 to December 1864, Lieutenant Joel S. Kennard commanding. She accompanied ironclad ram CSS Atlanta in the engagement in which Atlanta was captured on June 17, 1863.

She escaped from Savannah on December 21, 1864 before the city fell to the forces of U.S. General William T. Sherman. She was later burned by her commanding officer and crew to prevent seizure by the Union.

References

Isondoga
Shipwrecks of the American Civil War
1863 ships
Maritime incidents in December 1864